Speomolops sardous is a species of beetle in the family Carabidae, the only species in the genus Speomolops.

References

Pterostichinae